The MG Magnette is an automobile that was produced by MG between 1953 and 1968. The Magnette was manufactured in two build series, the ZA and ZB of 1953 through to 1958 and the Mark III and Mark IV of 1959 through to 1968, both using a modified Wolseley body and an Austin engine.

MG Cars had previously used the Magnette name on their K-type and N-type models of the 1930s.


Magnette ZA

The Magnette ZA was announced on 15 October 1953 and debuted at the 1953 London Motor Show. Deliveries started in March 1954. Production continued until 1956, when 18,076 had been built.  It was the first monocoque car to bear the MG badge.

The Magnette was designed by Gerald Palmer, designer of the Jowett Javelin. It was the first appearance of the new four cylinder  B-Series I4 engine with a pair of -bore twin-choke SU carburettors, delivering , driving the rear wheels through BMC's new four-speed manual gearbox with synchromesh on the top three ratios.

Suspension was independent at the front using coil springs and had a live axle with half elliptic leaf springs at the rear. The steering was by rack and pinion. Hydraulically operated Lockheed  drum brakes were fitted to front and rear wheels. When leaving the factory the Magnette ZA optionally fitted the recently developed belted textile-braced, radial-ply Pirelli Cinturato 145HR15 tyres (CA67) but had 5.5-15 Dunlop tyres as standard.

The car had leather trimmed individual front seats and rear bench seat. The dashboard and door cappings were in polished wood. Although the heater was standard, the radio was still an optional extra. Standard body colours were black, maroon, green, and grey.

The similar Wolseley 4/44, first sold one year earlier, used the 1250 cc engine from the MG TF.  Although visually similar, the MG has lower suspension and only the front doors, boot lid and roof panels are shared. The 4/44 was replaced in 1956 by the 15/50.

The test car cost £914 including taxes.

Magnette ZB

The ZA was replaced by the Magnette ZB that was announced on 12 October 1956. Power was increased to  fitting -bore carburettors, increasing the compression ratio from 7.5 to 8.3, and modifying the manifold. The similar Wolseley 15/50 now shared the ZB's B-Series engine.

A semi-automatic transmission, marketed as Manumatic, was fitted as an option on 496 1957 Magnettes.

A Varitone model featured larger rear window and optional two tone paintwork, using a standard Pressed Steel body shell, the rear window opening enlarged in the Morris Motors body shop, Cowley, before painting. 18,524 ZBs were built.

Magnette Mark III

The Mark III announced 2 February 1959 was nearly identical to the Riley version (the 4/68) of the new Pinin Farina-designed midsize BMC saloon line. They both had truncated tail fins.

All versions (including the Austin A55 Cambridge Mark II, Morris Oxford V and Wolseley 15/60) were produced by the British Motor Corporation (BMC).

The car featured BMC's  1489 cc B type engine but, in the MG Magnette III (and its Riley sibling), performance was enhanced by fitting twin S.U. H.D.4 carburetters.

The interior featured a walnut veneer facia panel, door cappings and leather upholstery as well as safety glass windows.

A Mark III was tested by The Motor magazine in 1959. The test car cost £1012 including taxes.  16,676 Mark IIIs were built.

Magnette Mark IV

The Mark III was updated in 1961 as the Mark IV.  A larger 1.6 L (1622 cc) B-Series engine, with capacity increased by increasing the bore to 76.2 mm, was fitted, and the car had a longer wheelbase and wider track.  To improve handling anti-roll bars were fitted front and rear. From the outside, the Mark IV was almost identical to the Mark III, apart from the remodelled and slightly less sharply pointed tailfins, a modification shared with its Riley sibling.

Automatic transmission was offered as an option.

The model continued to be listed through till May 1968 when the manufacturers announced that production had ceased with "no immediate replacement ... contemplated". 14,320 Mark IVs were built.

Other cars carrying the Magnette name

In 2011, MG Motor confirmed that the saloon version of the MG 6 
would carry the Magnette name for the UK, Europe and China.

At the media launch held at the historic Goodwood Circuit, MG Motor displayed the  MG 6 Magnette alongside examples of the earlier ZA and ZB Magnettes to reinforce the continuity of the brand.

References

External links

MG Magnette Register of the MG Car Club
Farina Magnette Register

Magnette
Cars introduced in 1953
Cars discontinued in 1968
Rear-wheel-drive vehicles
Sedans
Compact executive cars
1960s cars